This is a list of flags of the State of Palestine (including preceding flags of the Palestinian Authority and PLO).

National flag

Historical Flags

Proposed flags

See also
List of flags of Israel

References

National symbols of the State of Palestine